Dakjuk (hangul: 닭죽) is a type of Korean porridge, or juk, made with chicken. While Korean food is often spicy, dakjuk is not, making it easy to digest. Medical patients and children often eat dakjuk in Korea. These days, dakjuk has become more popular for its high nutritional value so people can try it in many restaurants specializing in juk in Korea. Dakjuk is different from the chicken soup found in Western countries in recipe, taste and ingredients.

The primary ingredients are rice, chicken, garlic and green onions.

See also

 List of porridges

References

Juk
Korean chicken dishes